Mi Vida: Grandes Éxitos is a double-CD greatest hits album by Spanish singer Julio Iglesias, released on October 13, 1998 through Columbia Records.

The album contained a special selection of 38 songs Julio Iglesias had recorded over four decades.

Four other versions of the album were issued simultaneously for the English, Portuguese, Italian, and French-speaking markets.  These regional editions mostly included songs performed by Iglesias in the languages specific to those markets, although all versions included tracks in Spanish and English that overlapped with the track listing of the original Spanish album.

Track listing

Disc 1

Disc 2

Charts

Certifications and sales

See also 
 List of number-one albums of 1998 (Spain)

References 

1998 compilation albums
Julio Iglesias albums
Sony Music Latin compilation albums